The 1922 Oglethorpe Stormy Petrels football team represented Oglethorpe University in the sport of American football during the 1922 college football season. The Stormy Petrels faced a tough schedule, evidenced by its record. They played against some of the toughest teams in the United States. Many of the games were very close. An interesting note is that the Sewanee assistant, Herb Stein, was the brother of the Oglethorpe coach.

Schedule

References

Oglethorpe
Oglethorpe Stormy Petrels football seasons
Oglethorpe Stormy Petrels football